Paul R. Alfonsi (February 13, 1908 – November 22, 1989) was a Wisconsin politician and speaker of the Wisconsin State Assembly.

Born in Pence, Wisconsin, Alfonsi graduated from the University of Wisconsin–Whitewater, and then taught school. Alfonsi served in the Wisconsin State Assembly from 1933 to 1939 and again from 1959 to 1969, and he was the speaker of the Assembly in 1937. Alfonsi ran unsuccessfully to gain the Progressive Party nomination for governor in 1940 but was defeated by Orland Loomis. In 1942 he switched parties and again unsuccessfully ran in the Republican primary against Alvin O'Konski. Following this defeat, he enlisted in the United States Army during World War Two. Upon being discharged, he returned to teaching and became the principal of Minocqua High School. Alfonsi returned to the state assembly, this time as a Republican, in 1958, and went on to serve as the assembly majority and minority leader. Alfonsi represented Iron, Vilas, and Oneida counties.  In 1967, Alfonsi was convicted of bribery. However, the Wisconsin Supreme Court overturned the conviction. Then Alfonsi was retried, but was acquitted. Alfonsi died in Madison, Wisconsin on November 22, 1989.

Notes

People from Iron County, Wisconsin
University of Wisconsin–Whitewater alumni
Members of the Wisconsin State Assembly
Speakers of the Wisconsin State Assembly
1908 births
1989 deaths
20th-century American politicians